The Sāheb ol Amr Mosque ( - Masjid-e Sāheb ol Amr) or King Tahmasp Mosque is a mosque located on the east side of Saaheb Aabaad square in Tabriz, Iran. The mosque was initially built in 1636 and has a history of destruction and repair. The name Sāheb ol Amr (Master of command) is one of the titles of the last Twelver Shī‘ah Imām.

History
The mosque was originally built in 1636 by the Safavid king Tahmasp I, on the east side of Saaheb Aabaad square in Tabriz. However the building was destroyed by the Ottoman ruler Murad IV after invading Tabriz in 1638. Once Persian troops re-affirmed control over the city, the mosque was rebuilt but suffered great damage from an earthquake that struck the city soon after. Consequently, the entire square along with the mosque was reconstructed and this task was carried out by Goli Khan Danbali. In favour of the people, the mosque was dubbed Sāheb ol Amr, a title of the last Twelver Shī‘ah Imām, Muhammad al-Mahdi.

In 1850, Mirza Ali Akbar Khan, who was the Russian Consulate interpreter, rebuilt some other parts of dome, and added mirrors to the corridor. A school was built in the front part of the dome which (Mira Ali Amber or Ambaries School). 

The school yard was destroyed during the expansion of Daraiee Street by the city of Tabriz and only a part of school is now serrained.

Gallery

See also
 List of Mosques in Iran
 Blue Mosque, Tabriz
 Shohada Mosque
 Madrasah Akbarieh
 Haidarzadeh house
 House of Seghat ol Islam

References
 http://www.eachto.ir

External links

 Virtual Museum of Historical Buildings of Tabriz (School of Architecture, Tabriz Islamic Art University).
 Tabriz Islamic Art University (دانشگاه هنر اسلامی تبریز), Tabriz, Iran (in Persian). 
 Picture gallery, Tabriz Islamic Art University (دانشگاه هنر اسلامی تبریز), Tabriz, Iran (in Persian). 
 Iranian Student's Tourism & Traveling Agency, ISTTA. (English), (Persian)
Tabriz virtual gallery

Mosques in Tabriz
Religious buildings and structures completed in 1636
Mosque buildings with domes
17th-century mosques
1636 establishments in Iran